The  Oakland Raiders season was the franchise's 45th season in the National Football League and the 55th overall. Head coach Dennis Allen was fired on September 29 following an 0–4 start, and compiled an 8–28 record in 2+ seasons in Oakland. Offensive line coach Tony Sparano was named interim head coach on September 30. The Raiders were officially eliminated from the playoffs after their Week 11 loss to the Chargers, therefore becoming the earliest team since the 2004 Dolphins to be eliminated from postseason contention.

After a run of 16 straight losses, including an 0–10 start which had not happened since the 2011 Indianapolis Colts, the Raiders won 24–20 against the Kansas City Chiefs on November 20. 

The last member from the 2014 squad still a Raider was quarterback Derek Carr until his release after the 2022 season. As of 2023, Carr is a member of the New Orleans Saints.

Draft

Draft trades
 The Raiders acquired two additional seventh-round selections — No. 235 as part of a trade that sent quarterback Carson Palmer to the Arizona Cardinals, and No. 247 in a trade that sent quarterback Terrelle Pryor to the Seattle Seahawks.

Staff

Final roster

Schedule

Preseason

Regular season

Note: Intra-division opponents are in bold text.

Game summaries

Week 1

Source: Recap, Gamebook

The Raiders started their season on the road against the Jets. In the first quarter, the Jets grabbed an early lead as Nick Folk kicked a field goal from 45 yards out for a 3–0 lead. The Raiders took the lead later on in the quarter as Derek Carr found Rod Streater on a 12-yard touchdown pass for a 7–3 game. In the 2nd quarter, the Jets retook the lead when Geno Smith found Chris Johnson on a 5-yard touchdown pass for a 10–7 game at halftime. After the break, the Jets returned to work as Folk kicked another field goal from 42 yards out for a 13–7 game for that quarter's only score. In the 4th quarter, they increased their lead as Chris Ivory ran for a 71-yard touchdown (with a failed 2-point conversion) for a 19–7 game. The Raiders scored late in the 4th quarter when Carr found James Jones on a 30-yard touchdown pass for a 19–14 final score.

With the loss, the Raiders started their season 0–1.

Week 2

Source: Recap, Gamebook

After a road loss to the Jets, the Raiders went home to take on the Texans.  The Texans would dominate the first half scoring in both the first and second quarters:  Ryan Fitzpatrick found J. J. Watt on a 1-yard touchdown pass for a 7–0 lead followed by Arian Foster's 5-yard touchdown run for a 14–0 and lastly Randy Bullock kicking a 33-yard field goal for a 17–0 lead at halftime.  After the break, the Texans went back to work in the 3rd quarter as DeAndre Hopkins caught a 12-yard touchdown pass from Fitzpatrick for a 24–0 lead followed up by Bullock kicking a 39-yard field goal for a 27–0 lead.  The Raiders finally got on the board in the 4th quarter as Darren McFadden ran for a 1-yard touchdown making it a 27–7 game.  The Texans moved ahead as Bullock kicked a 46-yard field goal for a 30–7 game.  The Raiders scored the final points of the game as Derek Carr found James Jones on a 9-yard touchdown pass for a 30–14 loss.

With the loss, the Raiders fell to 0–2.

Week 3

Source: Recap, Gamebook

After a home loss to the Texans, the Raiders traveled east to take on the Patriots.  The Raiders took an early lead when Sebastian Janikowski kicked a 49-yard field goal for a 3–0 game and the only score of the first quarter.  The Patriots took the lead in the 2nd quarter when Tom Brady found Rob Gronkowski on a 6-yard touchdown pass for a 7–3 game followed up by Stephen Gostowski kicking a 21-yard field goal for a 10–3 lead at halftime.  In the 3rd quarter, the Raiders went back to work as Janikowski nailed 2 field goals from 37 and 47 yards out coming within 4, 10–6 and then within 1, 10–9.  However, in the 4th quarter, the Patriots were able to eventually win the game when Gostkowski kicked 2 field goals from 20 and 36 yards out first for a 13–9 and the eventual final score of 16–9.  The Raiders were held without a touchdown in a single game for the first time since their 17–6 loss to the Panthers in 2012.

With the loss, the Raiders dropped to 0–3.

Week 4

Source: Recap, Gamebook

The Raiders traveled to London and were considered the home team in the International Series against the Dolphins.  In the first quarter, they would score first when Derek Carr found Brian Leonhardt on a 3-yard touchdown pass for a 7–0 lead.  Later on, the Dolphins got on the board when Caleb Sturgis kicked a 41-yard field goal to shorten the lead to 7–3.  This was the beginning of 35 consecutive points for the team as in the 2nd quarter they took the lead when Ryan Tannehill found Mike Wallace on a 13-yard touchdown pass, Lamar Miller ran for a touchdown from 9 yards out, and then Tannehill found Dion Sims on an 18-yard touchdown pass for leads of 10–7, 17–7, and the eventual halftime score of 24–7.  In the 3rd quarter, the Dolphins went back to work as Lamar Miller ran for another touchdown from 1 yard out for a 31–7 lead before Cortland Finnegan returned a fumble 50 yards for a touchdown for a 38–7 lead.  In the 4th quarter, the Raiders were able to wrap up the scoring when Backup QB Matt McGloin found Andre Holmes on a 22-yard touchdown pass for the eventual final score of 38–14.

With the loss, the Raiders went 0–4 heading into their bye week.

Week 6

Source: Recap, Gamebook

After resting up from their bye week, the Raiders returned to the O.co Coliseum for a home game against the Chargers.  In the first quarter, they snagged an early 7–0 lead when Derek Carr found Andre Holmes on a 77-yard touchdown pass. Later, the Chargers would tie it up 7–7 when Philip Rivers found Eddie Royal on a 29-yard touchdown pass. In the 2nd quarter, the Chargers took the lead when Rivers found Malcom Floyd on a 5-yard touchdown pass for a 14–7 game. However, the Raiders managed to tie it up before halftime when Carr found James Jones on a 6-yard touchdown pass for a 14–14 game. In the 3rd quarter, the Raiders retook the lead when Carr found Brice Butler on a 47-yard touchdown pass leading 21–14. The Chargers however tied it back up when Rivers found Antonio Gates on a 1-yard touchdown pass for a 21–21 game. In the 4th quarter, the Raiders retook the lead again when Carr found Holmes again on a 6-yard touchdown pass for a 28–21 game. However, the Chargers were able to score 10 points later on in the quarter:  First when Nick Novak scored a field goal from 30 yards out to come within 4, 28–24 and then Branden Oliver's 1-yard run for a touchdown for the eventual final score of 31–28.

With the loss, the Raiders dropped to 0–5.

Week 7

Source: Recap, Gamebook

The Raiders stayed home for a game against the Cardinals.  The Cardinals scored first in the first quarter when Carson Palmer found Stepfan Taylor on a 2-yard touchdown pass for a 7–0 lead and the only score of the quarter.  They made it 14–0 in the 2nd quarter when Palmer found Michael Floyd on a 33-yard touchdown pass.  The Raiders got on the board when Darren McFadden ran for a 1-yard touchdown for a 14–7 lead followed up by Sebastian Janikowski kicking a 29-yard field goal for a 14–10 game at halftime.  In the 3rd quarter, the Raiders came within 1 as Janikowski managed to kick a 53-yard field goal for a 14–13 game.  The Cards however took control of the game as Taylor ran for a 4-yard touchdown for a 21–13 lead.  Finally in the 4th quarter the Cards wrapped up the scoring when Chandler Catanzaro nailed a 41-yard field goal for the eventual final score of 24–13.

With the loss, the Raiders dropped to 0–6 and with the Jaguars' win over the Browns, they became the league's only winless team.

Week 8

Source: Recap, Gamebook

After losses at home, the Raiders traveled to Cleveland to take on the Browns.  The Browns scored 9 straight points leading into the 2nd quarter when Billy Cundiff kicked 3 field goals from:  52 (in the 1st quarter), 33, and 26 yards out (in the 2nd quarter) for leads of 3–0, 6–0, and 9–0.  The Raiders got on the board when Sebastian Janikowski kicked 2 field goals before halftime from 46 and 38 yards out for a 9–3 and then 9–6 game at halftime.  After a scoreless 3rd quarter, the Browns got back to work in the 4th when Brian Hoyer found Andrew Hawkins on a 4-yard touchdown pass for a 16–6 lead followed by Ben Tate running in the end zone for a 5-yard touchdown for a 23–6 game.  The Raiders wrapped up the scoring of the game later on when Derek Carr found Andre Holmes 10-yard touchdown pass for the final score:  23–13.

With the loss, the Raiders fell to 0–7.

Week 9

Source: Recap, Gamebook

Still looking for their first win of the season 7 games through, the Raiders headed up to the Pacific Northwest to take on the defending champion Seattle Seahawks.

The Raiders received the opening kickoff and immediately scored on their first possession by means of a 48-yard field goal by Sebastian Janikowski. Up 3–0, the Oakland defense took the field and was unable to stop the Seahawks from responding. Seattle took advantage of the multiple flags against the defense as Marshawn Lynch and Russell Wilson facilitated a 72-yard drive to score the game's first touchdown on a 3-yard run by Lynch. Both teams went 3-and-out on their next offensive possession before Derek Carr was picked off by Seahawks LB Bruce Irvin who returned it 35 yards for a touchdown on the final play of the first quarter.

In the second quarter, Carr was intercepted again, this time by Richard Sherman. Seahawks kicker Steven Hauschka added a field goal to put the Seahawks up 17–3. Meanwhile, the Raiders were unable to stop turning the ball over. After Hauschka's field goal, on the ensuing kickoff, T.J. Carrie's return was fumbled at the Oakland 25 and recovered by Hauschka himself at the 31 yard line. Though the Seahawks were unable to turn it into any points on Hauschka's missed field goal, Lynch picked up his second rushing touchdown of the day later in the quarter, this time from 5 yards out, and the Seahawks led 24–3 at halftime. To start the second half, however, the Raiders scored in less than a minute by blocking Jon Ryan's punt and recovering it in the end zone for a touchdown. With 5 minutes left in the third, Carr connected with tight end Mychal Rivera on a 1-yard touchdown pass to bring Oakland to within 7. Hauschka added two more field goals early in the fourth quarter and the Seahawks had a 13-point advantage with just over 9 minutes remaining. It took the Raiders until two plays after the 2-minute warning to score. Carr hooked up with Rivera again on another 1-yard touchdown pass and left it up to an onside kick to determine the outcome. Unfortunately for Oakland, their onside kick try was recovered by Seattle's Jermaine Kearse, and the Seahawks hung on to claim the victory, 30–24.

With the loss, the Raiders dropped to 0–8 on the season.

Week 10

Source: Recap, Gamebook

After battling the Super Bowl champions in Week 9, the winless Raiders went back home for Week 10 to take on their divisional rival and the defending AFC Champion Denver Broncos for the first time all year.

Broncos QB Peyton Manning was immediately picked off by cornerback D.J. Hayden on his second pass of the game 30 seconds in. Taking over near midfield, the Raiders got down to the Denver 23, but were forced to kick a 41-yard field goal, which Janikowski was successful on. Broncos kicker Brandon McManus responded with a field goal of his own, and the game was tied at three apiece. In the second quarter, McManus added another field goal and, later in the period, the Raiders intercepted Manning again; this time, it was Justin Tuck. Oakland scored a touchdown off the turnover and took a 10–6 lead on a Derek Carr five-yard touchdown pass to wide receiver Brice Butler. However, after two unsuccessful drives for each team, Carr was  intercepted by Denver cornerback Bradley Roby and the Broncos stormed back with two quick touchdowns. Both touchdowns were passes by Manning to C. J. Anderson and Emmanuel Sanders of 51 and 32 yards, respectively. Denver led 20–10 at the half.

In the second half, Oakland's offensive miscues continued as Khalif Barnes fumbled at his own 13-yard line, and the Broncos wasted no time as Manning's 10-yard pass to Julius Thomas put Denver up by 17. Oakland's next possession ended in a punt, and Manning went right back to Thomas for another touchdown, Peyton's fourth of the day and second from 32 yards out. Carr was picked off again, the Broncos scored yet another touchdown on Manning's fifth of the game and second to Emmanuel Sanders, and the visitors took a commanding 41–10 lead. Down 31 points, the Raiders headed into the fourth quarter and were humiliated by the potent Denver offense, and were unable to do much more than score an insignificant touchdown with 53 seconds left. The Broncos left Oakland with a 41–17 win and moved to 7–2 on the season.

Meanwhile, the Raiders' woes continued as their record fell to 0–9.

Week 11

Source: Recap, Gamebook

With the loss, the Raiders fell to 0–10 and were the first team this season to be mathematically eliminated from postseason contention. They are the earliest team to be eliminated from the playoffs since the 2004 Miami Dolphins. The loss also mathematically guaranteed a fourth-place finish in the AFC West.

The Raiders also became the first team to start 0–10 after the 2011 Colts. They would later on be joined by the 2016 Cleveland Browns.

Week 12 vs Chiefs

With the upset win the Raiders not only improved to 1–10, but they finally snapped a 15-game regular season losing streak which dated back to 2013.  Also, QB Derek Carr got his first career NFL win as a starter.

Week 13

Source: Recap, Gamebook

The Raiders couldn't get things going offensively all game long as Derek Carr's inconsistency led to his benching. He was replaced by Matt Schuab in the second half. The defense wasn't a factor either as they couldn't stop the Rams' offense, especially their running game. The Raiders looked to respond after allowing 38 points in the first half, but it was too late as they would go on to lose in a 52–0 embarrassment.

Week 14

Source: Recap, Gamebook
    
    
    
    
    
    
    

This would snap a 13-game losing streak for Raiders against NFC teams. This would also be their first win against their Bay Area rivals since 2000.

Week 15

Source: Recap, Gamebook

Week 16

Source: Recap, Gamebook

Week 17

Source: Recap, Gamebook

With the loss, the Raiders ended their season 3–13.

Standings

Division

Conference

References

External links
 

Oakland Raiders seasons
R00
Oakland
Oakland